Austria–Kosovo relations refer to the bilateral relations of Austria and Kosovo. Kosovo has an embassy in Vienna and Austria has an embassy in Pristina.

Austria was one of the first countries to recognise Kosovo's independence on 28 February 2008. As a European Union (EU) member, Austria supports Kosovo in its euro-integration path.

Relations 

On 25 March 2011 Austrian Foreign Minister Michael Spindelegger stated that "Austria intends to increase its efforts to gain recognition for Kosovo's independence by all of the EU countries, Foreign Minister Michael Spindelegger said Friday, commenting on his visit to Kosovo... [and that] Kosovo needs to show the sceptical countries within the EU that it is doing what is necessary to protect its minorities".

Military 

Austria currently has 606 troops serving in Kosovo as peacekeepers in the NATO led Kosovo Force.

See also 
 Foreign relations of Austria
 Foreign relations of Kosovo
 Austria–Serbia relations
 Austria–Yugoslavia relations

Notes

References  

 
Bilateral relations of Kosovo
Kosovo